Lucie Šafářová was the defending champion, but withdrew from her second-round match against Kristýna Plíšková.

Mona Barthel won the title, defeating Plíšková in the final, 2–6, 7–5, 6–2.

Seeds

Draw

Finals

Top half

Bottom half

Qualifying

Seeds

Qualifiers

Draw

First qualifier

Second qualifier

Third qualifier

Fourth qualifier

External links 
 Draws on ITF website
 Main draw
 Qualifying draw

Singles